Jaen is a common male name among the Dutch-originating Afrikaans speakers in South Africa and somewhat common in Estonia.

References

African masculine given names